The 2009 Rally Argentina was the 29th running of the Rally Argentina and the fifth round of the 2009 World Rally Championship season. The rally consisted of 23 special stages and was run on 23–26 April. It was won by Citroën's Sébastien Loeb for the fifth consecutive year. His teammate Dani Sordo finished second.

Ford's Mikko Hirvonen, who was in second place only six seconds behind Loeb after stage 14, retired due to an engine problem. This gave Loeb a 20-point lead in the drivers' championship.
Hirvonen's teammate Jari-Matti Latvala, under pressure to get a good result after his recent crashes, dropped out of contention for the win after a puncture on Friday. His Focus WRC later incurred an electrical problem, costing over eight minutes, but he was able to continue and finish sixth.

Following Ford's problems, Petter Solberg was on course for his second podium of the season, but he soon ran into fuel pressure problems and the third place was inherited by his brother Henning. This marked his career fourth podium finish. Home country's Federico Villagra beat Stobart's Matthew Wilson to take a career-best fourth place. Citroën Junior Team drivers Sébastien Ogier and Conrad Rautenbach both retired on Saturday. However, Ogier re-joined the rally under superally rules and finished seventh. Production World Rally Championship class winner Nasser Al-Attiyah took the last points-scoring position.

Results

Special stages

Championship standings after the event

Drivers' championship

Manufacturers' championship

References

External links 
 Official site

Argentine
Rally Argentina
Rally Argentina